Etta McDaniel (December 1, 1890January 13, 1946) was an American actress who appeared in over 60 films between 1933 and 1946. She was the sister of actor Sam McDaniel and actress and Academy Award winner Hattie McDaniel.

Early life 
McDaniel was born in Wichita, Kansas. She began her entertainment career as a member of minstrel shows with several others of her family. Etta married John Alfred Goff, 2 Dec 1908, in Denver, Colorado. Her son was Edgar Henry Goff.

Career 
In 1914, at this point, Etta Goff, and her sister Hattie McDaniel launched an all-female minstrel show, called the McDaniel Sisters Company.

Etta McDaniel's feature film debut was in the 1933 King Kong, as the native woman who saves her baby from the approaching giant gorilla. She then became a supporting actress or extra, frequently in uncredited roles, performing as maids and nannies, including Lawless Nineties, 1936, a Western starring John Wayne. McDaniel died in Los Angeles, California, aged 55.

Partial filmography

King Kong (1933) as Native Woman
Personal Maid's Secret (1935) as Maid
The Arizonian (1935) uncredited
The Prisoner of Shark Island (1936)
Lawless Nineties (1936)
 The Magnificent Brute (1936)
 Termites of 1938 (1938)
 Life with Henry (1941)
Johnny Doughboy (1942)
The Great Man's Lady (1942)
Son of Dracula (1943)

References

External links

 
 
 

1890 births
1946 deaths
Actresses from Kansas
Actors from Wichita, Kansas
African-American actresses
American film actresses
20th-century American actresses
RKO Pictures contract players
20th-century African-American women
20th-century African-American people